João Manuel Pinto Tomé Santos (born 26 May 1973), known as João Pinto or João Manuel Pinto, is a Portuguese retired professional footballer who played as a central defender, currently a manager.

Playing career
Pinto was born in Carcavelos, Cascais. During his career he represented Clube Oriental de Lisboa, S.C. Campomaiorense, C.F. Os Belenenses, FC Porto and S.L. Benfica, retiring in 2007 after abroad stints with Ciudad de Murcia (Spanish Segunda División) and FC Sion (Swiss Super League). In his country's Primeira Liga, he amassed totals of 191 games and 20 goals over the course of ten seasons.

Used often as a last-minute centre-forward when his teams were trailing– he scored more than ten competitive goals for Porto – Pinto appeared once for the Portugal national side, coming on at half-time in the 1–1 friendly draw with England at Villa Park, on 7 September 2002.

Coaching career
Pinto started his managerial career in the summer of 2013, going on to be in charge of C.D. Cinfães in the third tier for only three months. On 23 December 2015, he was appointed academy director of Brazilian club Associação Portuguesa de Desportos.

Honours
Porto
Primeira Liga: 1995–96, 1996–97, 1997–98, 1998–99
Taça de Portugal: 1997–98, 1999–2000
Supertaça Cândido de Oliveira: 1996, 1998

Sion
Swiss Cup: 2005–06

References

External links

1973 births
Living people
Sportspeople from Cascais
Portuguese footballers
Association football defenders
Primeira Liga players
Segunda Divisão players
Clube Oriental de Lisboa players
S.C. Campomaiorense players
C.F. Os Belenenses players
FC Porto players
S.L. Benfica footballers
Segunda División players
Ciudad de Murcia footballers
Swiss Super League players
FC Sion players
Portugal under-21 international footballers
Portugal international footballers
Portuguese expatriate footballers
Expatriate footballers in Spain
Expatriate footballers in Switzerland
Portuguese expatriate sportspeople in Spain
Portuguese expatriate sportspeople in Switzerland
Portuguese football managers
Portuguese expatriate sportspeople in Brazil